Rubén Arosemena Valdés (born 11 April 1961) is a Panamanian politician. He served as the President of the National Assembly from 2001 to 2002. He was the Second Vice President of Panama in the Martín Torrijos administration from 2004 to 2009.

References 

1961 births
Living people
Vice presidents of Panama
Presidents of the National Assembly (Panama)
People's Party of Panama politicians